Gloeospermum is a plant genus in the Violaceae family. It has been found in Central American, including Panama, and Ecuador.

Species include:

 Gloeospermum boreale C.V.Morton
 Gloeospermum crassicarpum
 Gloeospermum diversipetalum

References 

Violaceae
Malpighiales genera
Taxonomy articles created by Polbot